Tadaharu (written: ,   or ) is a masculine Japanese given name. Notable people with the name include:

, Japanese swimmer
, Japanese daimyō
, Japanese sumo wrestler
, Japanese musician
, Japanese basketball player and coach
, Japanese academic
, Japanese daimyō

Japanese masculine given names